The Archdeacon of Ardagh was a senior ecclesiastical officer within the Anglican Diocese of Ardagh. As such he was responsible for the disciplinary supervision of the clergy within the Diocese.

The archdeaconry can trace its history back to Joseph Magodaig who then became the Bishop of Ardagh. The Archdeaconry is now combined with that of Elphin, one of two within the United Diocese of Kilmore, Elphin and Ardagh

List of archdeacons
Previous holders include:
1683–1696 Andrew Charlton
1705–1747 Thomas Taylor
1751–1762 Robert Hort
1762–1778 John Oliver
1778–1790 Chambre Corker 
1805–1820 Robert Beatty
1820–1839 Charles Le Poer Trench, a younger son of William Trench, 1st Earl of Clancarty,
1839– Marcus Gervais Beresford, DD, PCi,
 Thomas Carson, LL.D., later Bishop of Kilmore, Elphin and Ardagh, 1870 –1874
 John Richard Darley DD, later Bishop of Kilmore, Elphin and Ardagh, 1874 –1884,
1874–1891 Fitzmaurice Hunt
1891–1896 Frederic Potterton
1896–1915 William Moore, later Bishop of Kilmore, Elphin and Ardagh, 1915–1930.

References

Archdeacons of Ardagh
Lists of Anglican archdeacons in Ireland
Diocese of Kilmore, Elphin and Ardagh